A helicopter bucket or helibucket is a specialized bucket suspended on a cable carried by a helicopter to deliver water for aerial firefighting. The design of the buckets allows the helicopter to hover over a water source—such as a lake, river, pond, or tank—and lower the bucket into the water to refill it. This allows the helicopter crew to operate the bucket in remote locations without the need to return to a permanent operating base, reducing the time between successive drops.

Each bucket has a release valve on the bottom which is controlled by the helicopter crew. When the helicopter is in position, the crew releases the water to extinguish or suppress the fire below. Each release of the water is referred to as a drop.

Design

The size of each bucket is determined by the lifting capacity of the helicopter required to utilise each version. Some buckets can include fire retardant foam or the ability to pump water from the bucket into an internal tank. Worldwide, the term monsoon bucket is widely used and accepted as a generic term. In the United States, this type of bucket is officially referred to as a helibucket. The trademarked Bambi Bucket is also commonly used informally by firefighting crews to describe buckets developed by other manufacturers.

Variants 

A-Flex Firefighting Monsoon Bucket
Collapsible bucket produced by A-Flex Technology

Bambi Bucket
Collapsible bucket developed by Canadian Don Arney and produced by SEI Industries since 1983. Bambi Buckets were used in 2011 to cool nuclear reactors in Japan after damage from a tsunami.

CLOUDBURST Fire Bucket
Collapsible bucket produced by IMSNZ Ltd.

FAST Bucket
Variable Drop, fire fighting bucket that allows the pilot to select drop patterns for bush fires to canopy fires, manufactured by Absolute Fire Solutions

HELiFIRE Monsoon Bucket
Collapsible and free-standing monsoon buckets produced by Rural Fire Service in New Zealand

Water Hog Bucket
Lightweight, collapsible, free-standing bucket developed and produced by Aerial Fire Control Pty Ltd since 2001

See also
 Helicopter rescue basket
 Helitack — helicopter-delivered fire resources
 Cargo hook (helicopter)

References

External links

Wildfire suppression equipment
Aerial firefighting
Helicopter equipment